Polymethylpentene (PMP), also known as poly(4-methyl-1-pentene), is a thermoplastic polyolefin. It is used for gas-permeable packaging, autoclavable medical and laboratory equipment, microwave components, and cookware. It is commonly called TPX, which is a trademark of Mitsui Chemicals.

Production
Polymethylpentene is a 4-methyl-1-pentene-derived linear isotactic polyolefin and is made by Ziegler–Natta type catalysis. The commercially available grades are usually copolymers. It can be extruded and moulded (by injection moulding or blow moulding).

Physical properties
Polymethylpentene melts at ≈ 235 °C. It has a relatively low density (0.84 g/cm3) among plastics and is transparent. It has low moisture absorption, and exceptional acoustical and electrical properties. Its properties are reasonably similar to those of other polyolefins, although it is more brittle and more gas permeable. The polymer also has a high thermal stability, excellent dielectric characteristics and a high chemical resistance.  The crystalline phase has a lower density than the amorphous phase.

In comparison to other materials being used for operating in THz range, TPX shows excellent optical properties with a wavelength independent refractive index of 1.460±0.005 between visible light and 100~GHz.

Applications
Applications include sonar covers, speaker cones, ultrasonic transducer heads, and lightweight structural parts. It is also FDA compliant for use in food processing machinery. Polymethylpentene is often used in films and coatings for gas-permeable packaging.
Because of its high melting point and good temperature stability, polymethylpentene is used for autoclavable medical and laboratory equipment, microwave components, and cookware.
It is also often used in electrical components e.g. LED molds because it is an excellent electrical insulator.
TPX is a hard, solid material, which can be mechanically shaped into various optical components like lenses and windows. It is used in CO2 laser pumped molecular lasers as an output window because it is transparent in the whole terahertz range and totally suppresses the ~10 μm pump radiation.

References

 Krentsel B.A., Kissin Y.V., Kleiner V.I., Stotskaya S.S. Polymers and Copolymers of Higher a-Olefins, Hanser Publishers: New York, 1997.
 H. C. Raine, J. Appl. Polym. Sci. 11, 39 (1969).
 Mitsui Chemicals Co., Properties of Standard TPX Grades, 2004.
 FDA CFR Title 21 Sec. 177.1520 Olefin polymers (C) 3.3b for TPX(4-methylpentene-1-based olefin copolymer)

External links
Mitsui Chemicals, Inc.
Tydex J.S.Co. - Manufacturer of polished TPX lenses and windows

Plastics
Polyolefins
Packaging materials
Household chemicals
Dielectrics
Thermoplastics
Organic polymers